KADL (102.9 FM) is a radio station broadcasting an adult hits format that is licensed to Imperial, Nebraska, United States. The station is owned by Armada Media - McCook, Inc. and features programming from ABC Radio.

History
The station was assigned the call letters KURK on July 2, 2001.  On April 14, 2003, the station changed its call sign to KJBL, on May 7, 2003 to KLHK, and on June 30, 2003 to KADL.

Construction permit

On May 27, 2010 KADL was granted a U.S. Federal Communications Commission construction permit to increase ERP to 100,000 watts. The permit will expire on May 27, 2013.

References

External links

ADL
Radio stations established in 2001
2001 establishments in Nebraska